John Heenan may refer to:

John Heenan (cardinal) (1905–1975), Roman Catholic Archbishop of Westminster
John C. Heenan (1834–1873), American bare-knuckle fighter

See also
Heenan (disambiguation)